Five Faces of Woman (Spanish: Cinco rostros de mujer) is a 1947 Mexican musical film directed by Gilberto Martínez Solares and starring Arturo de Córdova, Pepita Serrador and Ana María Campoy. The film's art direction was by Jorge Fernandez.

Cast
 Arturo de Córdova as Roberto  
 Pepita Serrador as Ivonne Parker  
 Ana María Campoy as Carmen  
 Miroslava as Beatriz  
 Rafael Alcayde as Miguel 
 Jorge Mondragon as Ugo Brunelli  
 Carolina Barret as Rosita  
 Manuel Noriega Ruiz as Pedro, mayordomo 
 Manuel Arvide as Gustavo Carreño  
 Conchita Gentil Arcos as Casera de Roberto  
 Clifford Carr as Enrique Parker 
 Rita Macedo as Elena  
 José Morcillo as Oficial policía portugues 
 Juan Orraca as Jugador de cartas  
 Tita Merello as Margot 
 Daniel Arroyo as Doctor 
 Pedro Elviro as Gendarme
 Enrique García Álvarez as Padre de Beatriz  
 Ramón Gay as Jugador cartas  
 Juan Pulido as Gendarme  
 Nicolas Rodriguez as Jugador cartas  
 Manuel Sánchez Navarro as Jugador cartas  
 Manuel Trejo Morales as Hombre en casino  
 María Valdealde as Esposa de Antonio  
 Hernán Vera as Antonio, cantinero

References

Bibliography 
 Frank Javier Garcia Berumen. Brown Celluloid: 1894-1959. Vantage Press, 2003.

External links 
 

1947 films
1940s musical drama films
Mexican musical drama films
1940s Spanish-language films
Films directed by Gilberto Martínez Solares
Mexican black-and-white films
1947 drama films
1940s Mexican films